HMS Triumph is a  nuclear submarine of the Royal Navy and was the seventh and final boat of her class. She is the nineteenth nuclear-powered hunter-killer submarine built for the Royal Navy. Triumph is the tenth vessel, and the second submarine to bear the name.  The first HMS Triumph was a 68-gun galleon built in 1561. As of 2022, she is the last boat of her class remaining in service.

Triumph was laid down in 1987 by Vickers Shipbuilding and Engineering Limited. One year previously, a mistake by senior management and changing shipbuilding methods meant that the Vickers shipyard in Barrow-in-Furness accidentally welded part of the submarine in an upside-down position. This was later corrected, and the ship was launched in February 1991 by Mrs. Ann Hamilton, wife of the then Armed Forces Minister Archie Hamilton. She was commissioned in October that same year.

Triumph is expected to remain in service until 2024.

Operational history

Triumph sailed to Australia in 1993, travelling  submerged without support—the longest solo deployment so far by a Royal Navy nuclear submarine.

War in Afghanistan
After the 9/11 attacks in the United States, Triumph, along with her sister ship , formed part of a task group in 2001 as part of the American-led invasion of Afghanistan, Britain's contribution being known as Operation Veritas. During Operation Veritas, Triumph launched Tomahawk missiles at targets inside Afghanistan. When Triumph returned home after operations had ended, the boat flew the Jolly Roger, the traditional way of denoting live weapons had been fired.

The boat surfaced in a safe and controlled fashion. She was under the command of trainee officers and an investigation attributed the grounding to poor navigation. Triumph suffered only superficial damage.

In 2005, Triumph began a £300 million nuclear refuel and refitting period which also saw the installation of an updated 2076 bow, flank and towed array sonar and a new command and control system. The boat rejoined the fleet in June 2010 and will be the last of the Trafalgar-class submarines to be decommissioned. 

Triumph was also featured in the TV programme How to Command a Nuclear Submarine in 2011 in which trainee commanding officers are shown on the Navy's "Perisher Course".

Libya operations
In March 2011, she participated in Operation Ellamy, firing Tomahawk cruise missiles on 19 March 20 March and again on 24 March at Libyan air defence targets from the Mediterranean Sea. One of these strikes hit a command and control centre in Colonel Gaddafi's presidential compound. Triumph returned to Devonport on 3 April 2011 flying a Jolly Roger adorned with six small tomahawk axes to indicate the missiles fired by the submarine in the operation.

Eleven weeks later on 20 June upon her return to Devonport, in the interim having deployed for a second deployment in the Mediterranean and relieving , she once again flew the Jolly Roger adorned with tomahawks, indicating that further cruise missile strikes had taken place in Libya as part of the ongoing operations there. Analysts believe that in total more than 15 cruise missiles were fired by the submarine during the operations.

2011/2012 deployment

In November 2011, Triumph sailed from her home port in Devonport for a seven-month deployment that will see her away from the UK until summer 2012. The deployment will see her operate in a wide range of locations including the Atlantic, the Mediterranean, the Arabian Sea and the Indian Ocean.

2013
In May 2013, her refit was reported complete and she returned to operational duties which continued to 2018.

2022
Following the Integrated Review of 2020, her service was extended by 18 months, now to continue until the end of 2024.

In December 2022, the submarine was reported to have returned to sea for post-refit trials, following a four-year refit to extend her service life to about 2024/25. In January 2023, the submarine was reported to have deployed to the Clyde naval base, likely for operational sea training.

Home port and affiliations
Triumph is part of the Devonport Flotilla based at Devonport.

She is currently affiliated with:
Blackpool Borough Council
Newton Abbot Town Council
The Duke of Lancaster's Regiment
Sussex University Royal Naval Unit
Worshipful Company of Upholders
TS Exmouth Sea Cadet Unit
TS Amazon Sea Cadet Unit
1322 (Newton Abbot) Squadron Air Training Corps
The Royal Naval Association (Newton Abbot Branch)
The Royal British Legion (Newton Abbot Branch)

References

External links

Royal Navy HMS Triumph (royalnavy.mod.uk)

 

Trafalgar-class submarines
Ships built in Barrow-in-Furness
1991 ships
Submarines of the United Kingdom